The 2017–18 Orlando Magic season was the 29th season of the franchise in the National Basketball Association (NBA). On May 23, 2017, the Magic announced that John Hammond would be the new general manager, thus officially ending his tenure with the Milwaukee Bucks. Finishing with a 25–57 record, the Magic extended their postseason drought to six consecutive years. On April 12, 2018, Frank Vogel was fired by the Magic after the conclusion of the 2017–18 season.

Draft picks

Roster

Standings

Division

Conference

Game log

Preseason

|- style="background:#fcc;"
| 1
| October 2
| @ Memphis
| 
| Jonathan Isaac (15)
| Wesley Iwundu (6)
| Evan Fournier (5)
| FedExForum12,986
| 0–1
|- style="background:#cfc;"
| 2
| October 5
| Dallas
| 
| Aaron Gordon (17)
| Aaron Gordon (10)
| Elfrid Payton (5)
| Amway Center15,849
| 1–1
|- style="background:#cfc;"
| 3
| October 7
| Miami
| 
| Aaron Gordon (19)
| Bismack Biyombo (9)
| Elfrid Payton (9)
| Amway Center18,428
| 2–1
|- style="background:#fcc;"
| 4
| October 9
| @ Dallas
| 
| D. J. Augustin (24)
| Nikola Vučević (14)
| Arron Afflalo (7)
| American Airlines Center16,055
| 2–2
|- style="background:#cfc;"
| 5
| October 10
| @ San Antonio
| 
| Aaron Gordon (27)
| Aaron Gordon (11)
| Jonathon Simmons (10)
| AT&T Center17,671
| 3–2
|- style="background:#fcc;"
| 6
| October 13
| Cleveland
| 
| Aaron Gordon (21)
| Bismack Biyombo (9)
| Elfrid Payton (6)
| Amway Center19,503
| 3–3

Regular season

|- style="background:#cfc;"
| 1
| October 18
| Miami
| 
| Evan Fournier (23)
| Nikola Vučević (12)
| Elfrid Payton (9)
| Amway Center18,846
| 1–0
|- style="background:#fcc;"
| 2
| October 20
| @ Brooklyn
| 
| Nikola Vučević (41)
| Nikola Vučević (12)
| Augustin, Fournier (5)
| Barclays Center16,144
| 1–1
|- style="background:#cfc;"
| 3
| October 21
| @ Cleveland
| 
| Nikola Vučević (23)
| Nikola Vučević (7)
| D. J. Augustin (10)
| Quicken Loans Arena20,562
| 2–1
|- style="background:#cfc;"
| 4
| October 24
| Brooklyn
| 
| Aaron Gordon (41)
| Aaron Gordon (14)
| D. J. Augustin (6)
| Amway Center16,015
| 3–1
|- style="background:#cfc;"
| 5
| October 27
| San Antonio
| 
| Evan Fournier (25)
| Bismack Biyombo (8)
| D. J. Augustin (6)
| Amway Center17,337
| 4–1
|- style="background:#fcc;"
| 6
| October 29
| @ Charlotte
| 
| Jonathon Simmons (27)
| Nikola Vučević (11)
| Augustin, Fournier (5)
| Spectrum Center15,531
| 4–2
|- style="background:#cfc;"
| 7
| October 30
| @ New Orleans
| 
| Fournier, Simmons, Vučević (20)
| Nikola Vučević (8)
| Augustin, Fournier, Mack, Simmons (4)
| Smoothie King Center14,004
| 5–2

|- style="background:#cfc;"
| 8
| November 1
| @ Memphis
| 
| Evan Fournier (22)
| Evan Fournier (8)
| Shelvin Mack (8)
| FedExForum15,434
| 6–2
|- style="background:#fcc;"
| 9
| November 3
| Chicago
| 
| Evan Fournier (21)
| Aaron Gordon (7)
| Shelvin Mack (8)
| Amway Center19,171
| 6–3
|- style="background:#fcc;"
| 10
| November 5
| Boston
| 
| Aaron Gordon (18)
| Aaron Gordon (12)
| Nikola Vučević (7)
| Amway Center17,731
| 6–4
|- style="background:#cfc;"
| 11
| November 8
| New York
| 
| Nikola Vučević (24)
| Elfrid Payton (6)
| Elfrid Payton (11)
| Amway Center18,500
| 7–4
|- style="background:#cfc;"
| 12
| November 10
| @ Phoenix
| 
| Aaron Gordon (22)
| Gordon, Vučević (7)
| Elfrid Payton (7)
| Talking Stick Resort Arena16,507
| 8–4
|- style="background:#fcc;"
| 13
| November 11
| @ Denver
| 
| Marreese Speights (19)
| Arron Afflalo (8)
| Shelvin Mack (8)
| Pepsi Center16,688
| 8–5
|- style="background:#fcc;"
| 14
| November 13
| @ Golden State
| 
| Nikola Vučević (20)
| Aaron Gordon (10)
| Shelvin Mack (6)
| Oracle Arena19,596
| 8–6
|- style="background:#fcc;"
| 15
| November 15
| @ Portland
| 
| Evan Fournier (22)
| Nikola Vučević (10)
| Elfrid Payton (5)
| Moda Center19,206
| 8–7
|- style="background:#fcc;"
| 16
| November 18
| Utah
| 
| Aaron Gordon (18)
| Aaron Gordon (9)
| Arron Afflalo (4)
| Amway Center19,157
| 8–8
|- style="background:#fcc;"
| 17
| November 20
| Indiana
| 
| Nikola Vučević (25)
| Nikola Vučević (13)
| Elfrid Payton (7)
| Amway Center17,239
| 8–9
|- style="background:#fcc;"
| 18
| November 22
| @ Minnesota
| 
| Aaron Gordon (26)
| Nikola Vučević (14)
| Elfrid Payton (13)
| Target Center16,402
| 8–10
|- style="background:#fcc;"
| 19
| November 24
| @ Boston
| 
| Jonathon Simmons (14)
| Nikola Vučević (11)
| Shelvin Mack (8)
| TD Garden18,624
| 8–11
|- style="background:#fcc;"
| 20
| November 25
| @ Philadelphia
| 
| Elfrid Payton (22)
| Nikola Vučević (14)
| Elfrid Payton (9)
| Wells Fargo Center20,585
| 8–12
|- style="background:#fcc;"
| 21
| November 27
| @ Indiana
| 
| Jonathon Simmons (21)
| Nikola Vučević (12)
| Elfrid Payton (5)
| Bankers Life Fieldhouse12,501
| 8–13
|- style="background:#cfc;"
| 22
| November 29
| Oklahoma City
| 
| Aaron Gordon (40)
| Aaron Gordon (15)
| Nikola Vučević (7)
| Amway Center17,797
| 9–13

|- style="background:#fcc;"
| 23
| December 1
| Golden State
| 
| Aaron Gordon (29)
| Biyombo, Gordon, Vučević (7)
| Elfrid Payton (9)
| Amway Center18,846
| 9–14
|- style="background:#cfc;"
| 24
| December 3
| @ New York
| 
| Nikola Vučević (34)
| Nikola Vučević (12)
| Elfrid Payton (5)
| Madison Square Garden19,082
| 10–14
|- style="background:#fcc;"
| 25
| December 4
| @ Charlotte
| 
| Evan Fournier (18)
| Nikola Vučević (8)
| Elfrid Payton (7)
| Spectrum Center14,419
| 10–15
|- style="background:#cfc;"
| 26
| December 6
| Atlanta
| 
| Evan Fournier (27)
| Nikola Vučević (16)
| Elfrid Payton (6)
| Amway Center16,167
| 11–15
|- style="background:#fcc;"
| 27
| December 8
| Denver
| 
| Simmons, Vučević (21)
| Nikola Vučević (17)
| Elfrid Payton (6)
| Amway Center16,024
| 11–16
|- style="background:#fcc;"
| 28
| December 9
| @ Atlanta
| 
| Nikola Vučević (31)
| Nikola Vučević (13)
| Nikola Vučević (10)
| Philips Arena12,719
| 11–17
|- style="background:#fcc;"
| 29
| December 13
| L.A. Clippers
| 
| Jonathon Simmons (20)
| Nikola Vučević (12)
| Jonathon Simmons (8)
| Amway Center16,011
| 11–18
|- style="background:#fcc;"
| 30
| December 15
| Portland
| 
| Nikola Vučević (26)
| Nikola Vučević (14)
| D. J. Augustin (4)
| Amway Center16,963
| 11–19
|- style="background:#fcc;"
| 31
| December 17
| @ Detroit
| 
| Mario Hezonja (28)
| Nikola Vučević (14)
| Payton, Simmons, Vučević (7)
| Little Caesars Arena16,312
| 11–20
|- style="background:#fcc;"
| 32
| December 20
| @ Chicago
| 
| Nikola Vučević (18)
| Nikola Vučević (10)
| Elfrid Payton (8)
| United Center20,285
| 11–21
|- style="background:#fcc;"
| 33
| December 22
| New Orleans
| 
| Jonathon Simmons (22)
| Simmons, Vučević (8)
| Elfrid Payton (6)
| Amway Center16,922
| 11–22
|- style="background:#fcc;"
| 34
| December 23
| @ Washington
| 
| Elfrid Payton (30)
| Payne, Payton (5)
| Elfrid Payton (10)
| Capital One Arena17,218
| 11–23
|- style="background:#fcc;"
| 35
| December 26
| @ Miami
| 
| Elfrid Payton (19)
| Bismack Biyombo (12)
| Elfrid Payton (6)
| American Airlines Arena19,600
| 11–24
|- style="background:#cfc;"
| 36
| December 28
| Detroit
| 
| Elfrid Payton (19)
| Bismack Biyombo (13)
| Elfrid Payton (8)
| Amway Center18,846
| 12–24
|- style="background:#fcc;"
| 37
| December 30
| Miami
| 
| Aaron Gordon (39)
| Bismack Biyombo (10)
| Elfrid Payton (13)
| Amway Center18,846
| 12–25

|- style="background:#fcc;"
| 38
| January 1
| @ Brooklyn
| 
| Aaron Gordon (20)
| Bismack Biyombo (17)
| Elfrid Payton (7)
| Barclays Center16,164
| 12–26
|- style="background:#fcc;"
| 39
| January 3
| Houston
| 
| Aaron Gordon (16)
| Mario Hezonja (9)
| Shelvin Mack (7)
| Amway Center18,588
| 12–27
|- style="background:#fcc;"
| 40
| January 6
| Cleveland
| 
| Aaron Gordon (30)
| Bismack Biyombo (11)
| D. J. Augustin (7)
| Amway Center18,997
| 12–28
|- style="background:#fcc;"
| 41
| January 9
| @ Dallas
| 
| Aaron Gordon (19)
| Marreese Speights (10)
| D. J. Augustin (5)
| American Airlines Center19,306
| 12–29
|- style="background:#fcc;"
| 42
| January 10
| @ Milwaukee
| 
| Evan Fournier (21)
| Bismack Biyombo (9)
| Elfrid Payton (7)
| BMO Harris Bradley Center14,543
| 12–30
|- style="background:#fcc;"
| 43
| January 12
| @ Washington
| 
| Elfrid Payton (27)
| Bismack Biyombo (13)
| Elfrid Payton (8)
| Capital One Arena18,171
| 12–31
|- style="background:#cfc;"
| 44
| January 16
| Minnesota
| 
| Evan Fournier (32)
| Bismack Biyombo (16)
| D. J. Augustin (6)
| Amway Center18,589
| 13–31
|- style="background:#fcc;"
| 45
| January 18
| @ Cleveland
| 
| Elfrid Payton (19)
| Bismack Biyombo (10)
| Elfrid Payton (8)
| Quicken Loans Arena20,502
| 13–32
|- style="background:#cfc;"
| 46
| January 21
| @ Boston
| 
| Elfrid Payton (22)
| Aaron Gordon (13)
| Gordon, Mack, Simmons (4)
| TD Garden18,624
| 14–32
|- style="background:#fcc;"
| 47
| January 23
| Sacramento
| 
| Evan Fournier (22)
| Aaron Gordon (12)
| Elfrid Payton (7)
| Amway Center18,846
| 14–33
|- style="background:#fcc;"
| 48
| January 27
| @ Indiana
| 
| Aaron Gordon (22)
| Aaron Gordon (11)
| Mack, Payton (5)
| Bankers Life Fieldhouse17,923
| 14–34
|- style="background:#fcc;"
| 49
| January 30
| @ Houston
| 
| Hezonja, Speights (17)
| Biyombo, Mack (6)
| Evan Fournier (5)
| Toyota Center18,055
| 14–35
|- style="background:#cfc;"
| 50
| January 31
| L.A. Lakers
| 
| Marreese Speights (21)
| Elfrid Payton (7)
| Shelvin Mack (7)
| Amway Center18,553
| 15–35

|- style="background:#fcc;"
| 51
| February 3
| Washington
| 
| Hezonja, Simmons (15)
| Khem Birch (8)
| Elfrid Payton (4)
| Amway Center18,846
| 15–36
|- style="background:#cfc;"
| 52
| February 5
| @ Miami
| 
| Mario Hezonja (20)
| Arron Afflalo (6)
| Elfrid Payton (7)
| American Airlines Arena19,600
| 16–36
|- style="background:#cfc;"
| 53
| February 6
| Cleveland
| 
| Jonathon Simmons (34)
| Bismack Biyombo (8)
| Elfrid Payton (8)
| Amway Center18,846
| 17–36
|- style="background:#cfc;"
| 54
| February 8
| Atlanta
| 
| Evan Fournier (22)
| Mario Hezonja (10)
| D. J. Augustin (9)
| Amway Center16,125
| 18–36
|- style="background:#fcc;"
| 55
| February 10
| Milwaukee
| 
| Mario Hezonja (23)
| Khem Birch (9)
| Shelvin Mack (10)
| Amway Center18,347
| 18–37
|- style="background:#fcc;"
| 56
| February 12
| @ Chicago
| 
| Mario Hezonja (24)
| Khem Birch (8)
| Shelvin Mack (6)
| United Center18,611
| 18–38
|- style="background:#fcc;"
| 57
| February 14
| Charlotte
| 
| Mario Hezonja (21)
| Mario Hezonja (10)
| D. J. Augustin (4)
| Amway Center18,428
| 18–39
|- align="center"
|colspan="9" bgcolor="#bbcaff"|All-Star Break
|- style="background:#fcc;"
| 58
| February 22
| New York
| 
| Evan Fournier (25)
| Nikola Vučević (6)
| Fournier, Gordon, Simmons (5)
| Amway Center18,846
| 18–40
|- style="background:#fcc;"
| 59
| February 24
| @ Philadelphia
| 
| Aaron Gordon (20)
| Nikola Vučević (9)
| Aaron Gordon (7)
| Wells Fargo Center20,594
| 18–41
|- style="background:#fcc;"
| 60
| February 26
| @ Oklahoma City
| 
| Fournier, Simmons (19)
| Gordon, Vučević (7)
| D. J. Augustin (9)
| Chesapeake Energy Arena18,203
| 18–42
|- style="background:#fcc;"
| 61
| February 28
| Toronto
| 
| Fournier, Hezonja (17)
| Bismack Biyombo (11)
| D. J. Augustin (6)
| Amway Center17,328
| 18–43

|- style="background:#cfc;"
| 62
| March 2
| Detroit
| 
| Aaron Gordon (27)
| Aaron Gordon (13)
| D. J. Augustin (9)
| Amway Center17,223
| 19–43
|- style="background:#cfc;"
| 63
| March 3
| Memphis
| 
| Fournier, Vučević (19)
| Aaron Gordon (8)
| D. J. Augustin (5)
| Amway Center17,875
| 20–43
|- style="background:#fcc;"
| 64
| March 5
| @ Utah
| 
| Nikola Vučević (15)
| Nikola Vučević (12)
| D. J. Augustin (5)
| Vivint Smart Home Arena18,306
| 20–44
|- style="background:#fcc;"
| 65
| March 7
| @ L.A. Lakers
| 
| Aaron Gordon (28)
| Aaron Gordon (14)
| D. J. Augustin (8)
| Staples Center18,997
| 20–45
|- style="background:#fcc;"
| 66
| March 9
| @ Sacramento
| 
| Jonathon Simmons (25)
| Bismack Biyombo (7)
| D. J. Augustin (7)
| Golden 1 Center17,583
| 20–46
|- style="background:#fcc;"
| 67
| March 10
| @ L.A. Clippers
| 
| Jonathon Simmons (24)
| Nikola Vučević (10)
| Jonathon Simmons (7)
| Staples Center16,561
| 20–47
|- style="background:#fcc;"
| 68
| March 13
| @ San Antonio
| 
| Simmons, Vučević (10)
| Nikola Vučević (10)
| D. J. Augustin (6)
| AT&T Center18,418
| 20–48
|- style="background:#cfc;"
| 69
| March 14
| Milwaukee
| 
| Jonathon Simmons (35)
| Birch, Vučević (9)
| Nikola Vučević (9)
| Amway Center17,713
| 21–48
|- style="background:#fcc;"
| 70
| March 16
| Boston
| 
| Shelvin Mack (16)
| Biyombo, Mack (7)
| D. J. Augustin (4)
| Amway Center18,981
| 21–49
|- style="background:#fcc;"
| 71
| March 20
| Toronto
| 
| Shelvin Mack (16)
| Nikola Vučević (9)
| D. J. Augustin (10)
| Amway Center16,228
| 21–50
|- style="background:#fcc;"
| 72
| March 22
| Philadelphia
| 
| Rodney Purvis (19)
| Aaron Gordon (11)
| Shelvin Mack (6)
| Amway Center17,881
| 21–51
|- style="background:#cfc;"
| 73
| March 24
| Phoenix
| 
| Aaron Gordon (29)
| Gordon, Vučević (11)
| D. J. Augustin (10)
| Amway Center17,393
| 22–51
|- style="background:#fcc;"
| 74
| March 28
| Brooklyn
| 
| Nikola Vučević (24)
| Nikola Vučević (15)
| Shelvin Mack (6)
| Amway Center16,517
| 22–52
|- style="background:#fcc;"
| 75
| March 30
| Chicago
| 
| Aaron Gordon (18)
| Nikola Vučević (14)
| D. J. Augustin (4)
| Amway Center18,918
| 22–53

|- style="background:#fcc;"
| 76
| April 1
| @ Atlanta
| 
| D. J. Augustin (20)
| Nikola Vučević (14)
| Shelvin Mack (5)
| Philips Arena13,587
| 22–54
|- style="background:#cfc;"
| 77
| April 3
| @ New York
| 
| Mario Hezonja (19)
| Nikola Vučević (10)
| Shelvin Mack (8)
| Madison Square Garden19,812
| 23–54
|- style="background:#cfc;"
| 78
| April 4
| Dallas
| 
| Aaron Gordon (20)
| Bismack Biyombo (12)
| Shelvin Mack (9)
| Amway Center18,112
| 24–54
|- style="background:#fcc;"
| 79
| April 6
| Charlotte
| 
| D. J. Augustin (19)
| Bismack Biyombo (8)
| Shelvin Mack (11)
| Amway Center17,018
| 24–55
|- style="background:#fcc;"
| 80
| April 8
| @ Toronto
| 
| Aaron Gordon (16)
| Khem Birch (12)
| Mario Hezonja (5)
| Air Canada Centre19,948
| 24–56
|- style="background:#fcc;"
| 81
| April 9
| @ Milwaukee
| 
| Nikola Vučević (17)
| Nikola Vučević (10)
| D. J. Augustin (9)
| BMO Harris Bradley Center18,717
| 24–57
|- style="background:#cfc;"
| 82
| April 11
| Washington
| 
| Mario Hezonja (15)
| Khem Birch (9)
| Mario Hezonja (6)
| Amway Center17,598
| 25–57

Transactions

Trades

  As part of the conditions in the 2013 four-way trade that saw Dwight Howard dealt to the Los Angeles Lakers, Orlando retains the 2018 second round pick of Los Angeles. Toronto will receive one of Orlando's two picks.

Free agency

Re-signed

Additions

Subtractions

References

Orlando Magic seasons
Orlando Magic
Orlando Magic
Orlando Magic
2010s in Orlando, Florida